Patrick Stephen Dinneen (25 December 1860 – 29 September 1934) was an Irish lexicographer and historian, and a leading figure in the Gaelic revival.

Life
Dinneen was born near Rathmore, County Kerry. He was educated at Shrone and Meentogues National Schools and at St. Brendan's College in Killarney. He earned second class honours bachelor's and master's degrees from the Royal University of Ireland.  The BA (1885) was in classics and mathematical science, the MA (1889) was in mathematical science. He joined the Society of Jesus in 1880 and was ordained a priest in 1894, but left the order in 1900 to devote his life to the study of the Irish language while still remaining a priest. After his ordination, he taught Irish, English, classics, and mathematics in three different Jesuit colleges, including Clongowes Wood College, a Jesuit boarding school near Clane, County Kildare.

He was a leading figure in the Irish Texts Society, publishing editions of Geoffrey Keating's , poems by Aogán Ó Rathaille, Piaras Feiritéar, Tadhg Gaelach Ó Súilleabháin, and other poets. He also wrote a novel and a play in Irish, and translated such works as Charles Dickens's A Christmas Carol into Irish. His best known work, however, is his Irish–English dictionary, which was first published in 1904. The stock and plates of the dictionary were destroyed during the Easter Rising of 1916, so Dinneen took the opportunity to expand the dictionary. A much larger second edition, compiled with the assistance of Liam S. Gógan, was published in 1927. Dinneen's request to the Irish Texts Society to include Gogan's name on the title page was refused. Gogan continued to work on the collection of words up to his death in 1979. This complementary dictionary was published online in 2011.

Fr. Dinneen died in Dublin at the age of 73 and is buried in Glasnevin Cemetery, Dublin.

Bibliography

See also 
 Dinneen

References

External links
 
 
 Scans of Dinneen's Irish-English dictionary (first edition of 1904)
 Searchable version of 1927 edition of Dinneen's Irish-English dictionary

1860 births
1934 deaths
19th-century Irish Jesuits
20th-century Irish Roman Catholic priests
Irish lexicographers
19th-century Irish historians
20th-century Irish historians
People educated at St Brendan's College, Killarney
People educated at Clongowes Wood College
Former Jesuits
Irish-language writers